David Daniel Stupich (5 December 1921 – 8 February 2006) was a member of the Legislative Assembly of British Columbia for most years from the 1960s to the 1980s, and a member of the House of Commons of Canada from 1988 to 1993. Stupich was born in Nanaimo, British Columbia to a coal miner.

He served five years in the Royal Canadian Air Force. After the war, he used his veteran's grant to get a degree in agriculture at the University of British Columbia. He then became a chicken farmer and studied at night to become a Chartered Accountant. He donated his spare time to doing books for local service clubs.

Provincial politics
His first political campaign was an unsuccessful bid to become a member of the Legislative Assembly of British Columbia in 1949. He was the provincial CCF party candidate for the Nanaimo and the Islands riding.

He entered provincial politics by winning the Nanaimo and the Islands riding in the 1963 British Columbia election. He was re-elected in the 1966 provincial election when the riding name changed to simply Nanaimo, but lost the riding to Social Credit candidate Frank Ney in the 1969 election. In the 1972 provincial election, Stupich defeated Ney and returned to the Legislature in the 1972 election, and remained a member until 1988. He introduced the Agricultural Land Reserve bill, which saved thousands of acres of farm land from the paver.

Federal politics
Stupich then entered federal politics and was elected in the 1988 federal election at the Nanaimo—Cowichan electoral district for the New Democratic Party. He served in the 34th Canadian Parliament but lost to Bob Ringma of the Reform Party in the 1993 federal election.

Bingogate
Stupich was the central figure in a scandal since known as Bingogate.  In the late 1950s, Stupich set up and controlled the Nanaimo Commonwealth Holding Society (NCHS), which raised funds on behalf of the NDP.

But after a tip that something was amiss from the head of the Nanaimo Commonwealth Bingo Association, the RCMP launched an investigation. It found Stupich ran kickback schemes in which donations to charities were refunded to NCHS. In 1999, Stupich, then 77, faced 64 charges, including theft, fraud, forgery and breach of trust. He pleaded guilty that year to fraud and running an illegal lottery, involving the misappropriation of about $1 million from the NCHS. He was sentenced to two years, serving it on electronic monitoring at his daughter's home in Nanaimo.

Setting the home of daughter Marjorie Boggis for electronic monitoring may have been related to the prospect of Stupich spending 2 years confined at the Palatial Gabriola Island mansion Stupich shared with partner Elizabeth Marlow. Related charges against Marlow and Boggis were stayed as part of a complex plea bargain. Photos of the walled and outdoor pool equipped Stupich & Marlow mansion added to public outrage about the scandal.

Even though he was personally uninvolved, then-Premier Mike Harcourt resigned as a result of the scandal.

Stupich died in 2006 at Dufferin Place, a long-term care facility in Nanaimo.

References

External links

1921 births
2006 deaths
British Columbia New Democratic Party MLAs
British Columbia political scandals
Canadian accountants
Canadian fraudsters
Canadian people of Croatian descent
Canadian politicians convicted of crimes
Farmers from British Columbia
Finance ministers of British Columbia
Members of the Executive Council of British Columbia
Members of the House of Commons of Canada from British Columbia
New Democratic Party MPs
People from Nanaimo
Politicians convicted of fraud
Royal Canadian Air Force officers
University of British Columbia alumni
20th-century Canadian politicians
Corruption in Canada